Pelican Island is an island in the Barnegat Bay wholly located in Ocean County, New Jersey.  It is accessible from Toms River and Seaside Heights via the Tunney and Mathis Bridges on New Jersey Route 37. It is part of Toms River and Berkeley Township.

Pelican Island was impacted significantly by damage from Hurricane Sandy.

References

Berkeley Township, New Jersey
Toms River, New Jersey
Landforms of Ocean County, New Jersey
Islands of New Jersey
Coastal islands of New Jersey